Judith Slaying Holofernes is a painting by the Italian early Baroque artist Artemisia Gentileschi, completed in 1612-13 and now at the Museo Capodimonte, Naples, Italy. The picture is considered one of her iconic works. The canvas shows Judith beheading Holofernes. The subject takes an episode from the apocryphal Book of Judith in the Old Testament,  which recounts the assassination of the Assyrian general Holofernes by the Israelite heroine Judith. The painting shows the moment when Judith, helped by her maidservant Abra, beheads the general after he has fallen asleep in a drunken stupor. 
She painted a second version now in the Uffizi, Florence, somewhere between 1613 and 1621.

Early feminist critics interpreted the painting as a form of visual revenge following Gentileschi's rape by Agostino Tassi in 1611; similarly many other art historians see the painting in the context of her achievement in portraying strong women.

Creation 
Artemisia Gentileschi was around twenty years of age when she painted Judith Slaying Holofernes. Previously, Gentileschi had also completed Susanna and the Elders and Madonna and Child. These artworks already give an indication of Gentileschi's skill in representing body movement and facial expressions to express emotions. X-rays undertaken on the painting show that Gentileschi made several alterations to the painting (e.g. the position of Judith's arms, the position of the drapery) before it reached its current state.

Sources and analysis 
The episode of Judith beheading Holofernes is from a deuterocanonical book of the Bible. The episode is from the apocryphal Book of Judith in the Old Testament,  which recounts the assassination of the Assyrian general Holofernes by the Israelite heroine Judith. Gentileschi draws upon the most climactic part of the Book of Judith  where the beheading takes place.

Judith Slaying Holofernes has been considered to be related to the Power of Woman theme. Historian Susan L. Smith defines the "power of woman" as "the representational practice of bringing together at least two, but usually more, well-known figures from the Bible, ancient history or romance to exemplify a cluster of interrelated themes that include the wiles of woman, the power of love and the trials of marriage. Gentileschi plays into the "wiles of woman" in her painting by literally portraying Judith at the main point of her domination over a man. Judith is shown as a beautiful woman which enticed Holofernes and also as a fierce heroine.

The painting is relentlessly physical, from the wide spurts of blood to the energy of the two women as they perform the act. The effort of the women's struggle is most finely represented by the delicate face of the maid, who is younger than in other treatments of the same theme, which is grasped by the oversized, muscular fist of Holofernes as he desperately struggles to survive. Judith Slaying Holofernes utilises deeper primary colours in comparison to the Florentine version. Judith is shown wearing a cobalt blue dress with gold accents and her maidservant  wears a red gown. Both women have their sleeves rolled up. As a follower of Caravaggio, Artemisia Gentileschi makes use of chiaroscuro in the painting, with a dark background contrasting with the light shining directly on the scene of Judith beheading Holofernes.

History 
Little is known of the painting's early history, however many scholars believe it was created while Artemisia was still living in Rome. There is no information as of yet on the patron of this artwork. Its location was unknown until documented in the collection of Signora Saveria de Simone in Naples in 1827. At some point in the painting's history, the left and top parts of the painting were cut off, leaving a curtailed version of the original painting.

Renaissance 

The Renaissance had a long-standing history of portraying Judith. Many artists believed that the heroine Judith held many different qualities like chastity and humility. Lucas Cranach the Elder painted a very straightforward version of Judith now known as  Judith with the Head of Holofernes. Cranach's Judith is shown with a resolved look on her face as she holds a sword in her hand. She wears an ornate green dress and the viewer can only see up to her mid-thigh region. Her body is cut off due to a marble ledge where the head of Holofernes sits. There is no gushing blood and Judith seems to have made a clean cut through Holofernes' neck. The phlegmatic look on Judith's face contrasts the intensity of her beheading. Gentileschi captures the emotions of Judith's face but maintains more medical accuracy with the blood that is spilling down the bed. She shows Judith in the act of beheading rather than showing her holding the head of Holofernes as Cranach did.

Donatello contributed his own interpretation with his sculpture Judith and Holofernes where Judith is depicted  towering over Holofernes with a sword over her head. Holofernes' body slumps over and his head is still attached to his body. Donatello's Judith and Holofernes sought to symbolize the theme of pride in Holofernes and stands as a cautionary tale to the Medici family. Writer Roger J. Crum notes that, "Judith's gesture, pulling back the general's head, renders sure her next blow, it also makes the neck all the more visible. 'Behold the neck of pride' commanded the inscription, and Donatello's treatment facilitated compliance". Unlike Donatello's sculpture, Gentileschi shows Judith triumphing over Holofernes in the climactic moment of the beheading. Gentileschi also chose to show Judith without a head-covering and includes Judith's maidservant.

Baroque 
Judith beheading Holofernes was a very popular story amongst Baroque artists. Artemisia Gentileschi's contemporary Johann Liss stayed abreast with the Baroque style by including macabre imagery in his painting, Judith in the Tent of Holofernes. The painting shows the headless body of Holofernes slumping over. Judith sweeps Holofernes's head into a basket showing a look of swiftness about her. The viewer can see the maidservant's head in the background while the rest of her body is unseen. She seems eager to see what directions Judith will give her next. The decapitated body of Holofernes has blood gushing out of it, showing Liss's interest in the human body. Gentileschi has a similar urgency in her painting but shows Judith in mid-decapitation rather than showing Holofernes headless body. Gentileschi also uses the same amount of bloodiness in her painting.

Caravaggio Influence 
Caravaggio's Judith Beheading Holofernes shows a different portrayal of this scene. Mary Gerrard points out that Caravaggio "reintroduced a narrative emphasis, but focusing now upon the dramatic rather than the epic features of the story and upon the human conflict between the two principal characters".  Caravaggio shows Holofernes holding the blood coming from his neck like a string. Rather than making the scene of Holofernes's beheading more palatable for the viewers, Gentileschi differs by not holding back the gruesome imagery. Gentileschi also shows Judith putting her full efforts into the slaying, even by employing her maidservant. In both Caravaggio and Gentileschi's paintings there is a notable absence of decorative detail in the background.

Judith beheading Holofernes has been depicted by a number of artists including Giorgione, Titian, Rembrandt, Peter Paul Rubens and Caravaggio.

Caravaggio's Judith Beheading Holofernes is believed to be the main inspiration of Gentileschi's work, and his influence shows in the naturalism and violence she brings to her canvas.

Related paintings by Artemisia Gentileschi 
Gentileschi painted another painting, Judith and her Maidservant (1613–14), which shows Judith holding a dagger while her maidservant carries a basket containing a severed head. Judith and her Maidservant is displayed in the Palazzo Pitti, in Florence. A further three paintings by Gentileschi, in Naples, Detroit and Cannes, show her maid covering the head of Holofernes, while Judith herself looks out the frame of the picture.  Gentileschi's father and fellow painter, Orazio Gentileschi was also very much influenced by Caravaggio's style and painted his own version of the tale, Judith and Her Maidservant with the Head of Holofernes.

Historiography 
There have been many different interpretations and viewpoints on Judith Slaying Holofernes by art historians and biographers alike. Art historian Mary Garrard believes that Judith Slaying Holofernes portrays Judith as a "socially liberated woman who punishes masculine wrongdoing". Although the painting depicts a scene from the Bible, art historians have suggested that Gentileschi drew herself as Judith and her mentor Agostino Tassi, who was tried for and convicted of her rape, as Holofernes. Gentileschi's biographer Mary Garrard famously proposed an autobiographical reading of the painting, stating that it functions as "a cathartic expression of the artist's private, and perhaps repressed, rage". Griselda Pollock suggests that the painting should be "read less in terms of its overt references to Artemisia’s experience than as an encoding of the artist's sublimated responses to events in her life and the historical context in which she worked." More recent discussion of the painting has moved away from too close a relationship to the rape of Gentileschi; rather it has focussed on Gentileschi's determination to paint strong women who are the centre of the action.

Reception 
The Florentine biographer Filippo Baldinucci described Judith Slaying Holofernes as "inspiring no little amount of terror." At times the painting was popular, mainly due to the grotesque nature of the biblical scene, but also because of the artist's gender. Yet when the painting was sold by Signora Saveria de Simone in 1827, it was sold as a work of Caravaggio. This confusion shows Gentileschi's dedication as a caravagistta. In recent decades, there has been much art historical interest in this painting, with Eva Straussman-Pflanzer explaining that "the painting has... gained... distinction due to its feminist-inspired inclusion in the history of art".

References

Paintings by Artemisia Gentileschi
Paintings about death
Paintings depicting Judith
Paintings in the collection of the Museo di Capodimonte
Christian art about death
1620 paintings